Noumea Airport may refer to:

 La Tontouta International Airport - the largest airport in Nouméa, New Caledonia, France
 Nouméa Magenta Airport - the domestic airport in Nouméa, New Caledonia, France